Porto Empedocle is a town and comune in Italy on the coast of the Strait of Sicily, administratively part of the province of Agrigento. It was named after Empedocles, a Greek pre-Socratic philosopher and a citizen of the city of Akragas (present-day Agrigento), in his day a Greek colony in Sicily.  The primary industries of Porto Empedocle are agriculture, fishing, ironworking, pharmaceuticals and rock salt refining.

Physical geography

Climate 
Porto Empedocle is the second comune with the lowest amount of degree days in Italy.

History 
Born as a port zone in the old Girgenti, today called Agrigento, under the name of Marina di Girgenti (seashore of Girgenti), since in the 15th century it was the main cereal trading centre of the region. From 1549 to 1554, by order of the viceroy Vega, Torre del caricatore of Girgenti, already known during the ancient times (as it probably already existed before the Angevin period), was restored. It had been built to protect against the Saracen pirates, together with the whole system of the Coastal towers of Sicily.
The tower was later again restored by Charles III with the help of Bishop . This restoration was completed only in 1763. In 1853, during the government of the Kingdom of the Two Sicilies the town obtained 
independence by becoming chief town of the decurionato under the name of Molo di Girgenti. Then, in 1863, the town changed its name into Porto Empedocle in memory of the Agrigentine philosopher Empedocles.

In 2003, the town changed its official denomination to Porto Empedocle Vigata, after the name of the fictional town where the novels by Andrea Camilleri, Italian writer and native of the town, about detective Inspector Montalbano are placed. However, the decision was revoked in 2009.

The main church is Parrocchia Maria SS. del Buon Consiglio, which is located in the center of the town. The marl Scala dei Turchi is located nearby, on the coast of Realmonte.

References

External links
"Porto Empedocle becomes Vigata"  Repubblica.it 
"Parrocchia Maria SS.del Buon Consiglio" 

Cities and towns in Sicily
Coastal towns in Sicily
Mediterranean port cities and towns in Italy